Paul Vogt may refer to:

 Paul C. Vogt, actor
 Paul L. Vogt, Rural Sociologist
 Paul Vogt (pastor)